Evelyn "The Whip" Young (March 25, 1928 – October 2, 1990) was an American saxophonist from Memphis, Tennessee, United States.

Career
At age 14, Young began playing saxophone professionally at Beale Street Chitlin' Circuit clubs run by Sunbeam Mitchell, while still enrolled at Manassas High School. In 1952, she formed a touring band with Bill Harvey for B.B. King in 1952, which lasted for eight years. From 1960 onward, she performed regularly at Mitchell's Club Handy, directing a 21-piece band there, and recorded with Little Richard, Bobby "Blue" Bland, Little Milton, Memphis Slim, and the Fieldstones.

Influence
Terry Johnson of the Stax session band the Mar-Keys recalls sneaking into Club Handy to hear Young play. In the documentary All Day and All Night: Memories from Beale Street Musicians, Young recalls B.B. King telling her that "everything I played on the saxophone was what he wanted to play on the guitar."

After her death, Fred Ford wrote that "She was as fine a musician as you'll ever hear . . . She never got the recognition she deserved in her lifetime, but she could sure play with anyone."

Selected recordings
 Rufus Thomas, "I'll Be a Good Boy" (1950)
B.B. King, "3 O'Clock Blues" (1952)

References

1928 births
1990 deaths
American blues saxophonists
musicians from Memphis, Tennessee
Musicians from Tennessee
20th-century American musicians
20th-century women musicians